Michael James Botterill (born November 9, 1980) is a professional Canadian football linebacker who is currently retired. He was selected in the sixth round with the 51st pick by the Montreal Alouettes in the 2003 CFL Draft. 

He played CIS football for the McMaster Marauders. Botterill also played for the Edmonton Eskimos and Hamilton Tiger-Cats.  

He is now working as a consultant with Investors Group serving clients in British Columbia and Ontario. 

Sportspeople from Belleville, Ontario
Canadian football linebackers
Montreal Alouettes players
Edmonton Elks players
Hamilton Tiger-Cats players
Players of Canadian football from Ontario
McMaster Marauders football players
1980 births
Living people